Statistics of Empress's Cup in the 2014 season.

Overview
It was contested by 36 teams, and Nippon TV Beleza won the championship.

Results

1st round
Nojima Stella Kanagawa Sagamihara 3-2 Sakuyo High School
Naruto Uzushio High School 0-2 Seiwa Gakuen High School
Shizuoka Sangyo University 1-2 JEF United Chiba U-18
AS Harima ALBION 3-0 Shimizudaihachi Pleiades
Sfida Setagaya FC 6-2 Niigata University of Health and Welfare
Fujieda Junshin High School 5-0 Himeji Dokkyo University
Hinomoto Gakuen High School 1-3 Ehime FC
JFA Academy Fukushima 3-0 Fukuoka J. Anclas
Albirex Niigata U-18 0-6 Tokiwagi Gakuken High School
Daisho Gakuen High School 5-1 Kamimura Gakuen High School
Japan Soccer College 0-2 Nippon Sport Science University
Angeviolet Hiroshima 2-1 Norddea Hokkaido

2nd round
Nojima Stella Kanagawa Sagamihara 3-1 Seiwa Gakuen High School
JEF United Chiba U-18 0-4 Iga FC Kunoichi
Urawa Reds Youth 0-0 (pen 3-4) AS Harima ALBION
Sfida Setagaya FC 0-1 Fujieda Junshin High School
Ehime FC 3-2 JFA Academy Fukushima
Tokiwagi Gakuken High School 3-2 Speranza FC Osaka-Takatsuki
Kibi International University 2-2 (pen 7-8) Angeviolet Hiroshima
Daisho Gakuen High School 0-1 Nippon Sport Science University

3rd round
Urawa Reds 6-0 Nojima Stella Kanagawa Sagamihara
Iga FC Kunoichi 3-1 AS Elfen Saitama
INAC Kobe Leonessa 4-0 AS Harima ALBION
Fujieda Junshin High School 0-4 JEF United Chiba
Nippon TV Beleza 9-0 Ehime FC
Tokiwagi Gakuken High School 0-4 Albirex Niigata
Vegalta Sendai 5-0 Angeviolet Hiroshima
Nippon Sport Science University 1-3 Okayama Yunogo Belle

Quarterfinals
Urawa Reds 2-0 Iga FC Kunoichi
INAC Kobe Leonessa 0-1 JEF United Chiba
Nippon TV Beleza 3-0 Albirex Niigata
Vegalta Sendai 6-1 Okayama Yunogo Belle

Semifinals
Urawa Reds 3-1 JEF United Chiba
Nippon TV Beleza 2-0 Vegalta Sendai

Final
Nippon TV Beleza 1-0 Urawa Reds
Nippon TV Beleza won the championship.

References

Empress's Cup
2014 in Japanese women's football